The Maze Runner is a 2014 American dystopian science fiction film directed by Wes Ball, in his directorial debut, based on James Dashner's 2009 novel of the same name. The film is the first installment in The Maze Runner film series and was produced by Ellen Goldsmith-Vein, Wyck Godfrey, Marty Bowen, and Lee Stollman with a screenplay by Noah Oppenheim, Grant Pierce Myers, and T.S. Nowlin. The film stars Dylan O'Brien, Kaya Scodelario, Aml Ameen, Thomas Brodie-Sangster, Ki Hong Lee, Will Poulter, and Patricia Clarkson. The story follows sixteen-year-old Thomas, portrayed by O'Brien, who awakens in a rusty elevator with no memory of who he is, only to learn that he has been delivered to the middle of an intricate maze, along with many other boys, who have been trying to find their way out of the ever-changing labyrinthall while establishing a functioning society in what they call the Glade.

Development of The Maze Runner began in January 2011 when Fox purchased the film rights to Dashner's novel with Gotham Group, Temple Hill Entertainment, TSG Entertainment as producers and Catherine Hardwicke intended to direct. In 2012, Ball was hired to direct the film adaptation after presenting a 3D computer-animated short film titled Ruin with a similar tone and was initially considered for a feature-length adaptation. Principal photography began in Baton Rouge, Louisiana on May 13, 2013, and officially concluded on July 12, 2013.

The Maze Runner was released on September 19, 2014, in the United States by 20th Century Fox. The film received positive reviews, with praise for the performances and tone. Critics considered it to be better than most young adult book-to-film adaptations. The film was first at the box office in its opening weekend, grossing $32.5million, making it the seventh-highest-grossing debut in September. The film earned over $348million worldwide at the box office, against its budget of $34million. A sequel, Maze Runner: The Scorch Trials, was released on September 18, 2015, in the United States. A third and final film, Maze Runner: The Death Cure, was released on January 26, 2018.

Plot

A teenage boy wakes up inside an underground elevator with no memory of his identity, and greeted by several male youths in a large grass area, called the "Glade," enclosed by tall stone walls. The "Gladers" have formed a rudimentary society, and each assumes specialized tasks. The boy learns that a vast Maze surrounding them is the only way out. During the day, designated Runners search the Maze for an escape route and return before nightfall when the entrance closes. After a competitive fight with Gally, the boy remembers his name is Thomas. The next day, he is attacked by Ben, a Runner who has been stung and left delirious by a Griever, one of the techno-organic creatures that roam the Maze at night. Ben is forced into the Maze and left to die as a direct consequence of his actions, along with there being no cure for his condition. Alby, the leader, and Minho, the lead Runner, later retrace Ben's steps inside the Maze the following morning. Minho reappears late in the afternoon dragging Alby, who has been stung, but are unable to reach the closing entrance in time. Thomas runs into the Maze to help, which leaves all three trapped. Thomas lures a Griever into a closing passageway, which causes it to be crushed. The three manage to survive the night and return the next morning.

A girl arrives in the elevator, with a note saying that she is the last one to enter the Glade, and recognizes Thomas, but he cannot remember her. Thomas, Minho, Frypan, Winston, and Zart enter the Maze, locate the Griever corpse, and remove a beeping mechanical device from inside it. Gally claims that Thomas has jeopardized the fragile peace between the Gladers and the Grievers, and wants him punished. However, Newt, the group's second-in-command, instead designates Thomas as a Runner. Minho shows Thomas a hand-constructed model of the Maze that is based on previous explorations. The Maze's numbered sections open and close in a regular sequence and Thomas realizes that the device corresponds to a section of the Maze.

The girl, Teresa, has two syringes filled with an unknown substance. One is used on Alby, and he recovers from the Griever sting. Minho and Thomas venture back into the Maze with the device and discover a possible exit. Several traps are activated, forcing Thomas and Minho to leave. That night, the Maze entrance does not close, and others open, allowing the Grievers to enter. Alby, Zart, Clint, and several others die and Gally blames Thomas for the events. Thomas, who has been having disconnected memory flashes since his arrival, stabs himself with a severed Griever stinger in an attempt to revive his memory before he is injected with the last anti-venom. Unconscious, he recalls that he and Teresa worked for the organization that created the Maze, WCKD, and the boys unknowingly have been test subjects for an experiment. Thomas awakens and confesses that he and Teresa worked with WCKD and studied the boys for years.

Meanwhile, Gally has taken command and intends to sacrifice Thomas and Teresa to the Grievers to restore peace. However, several Gladers free them and enter the Maze, but Gally and a few others refuse to leave. As they attempt to access a possible exit, Jeff and several other Gladers are killed by Grievers. The Gladers eventually enter a laboratory strewn with corpses. In a video recording, Ava Paige, a WCKD official, explains that the planet has been devastated by a massive solar flare, followed by a pandemic of a deadly virus, the Flare. The group learns that they were part of an experiment intended to develop a cure. Paige is seen shooting herself in the video as the lab is overtaken by armed men. Gally, having been stung by a Griever, appears, insists that they will never be free, and points a gun at Thomas. Minho impales Gally in the chest with a spear, but he fatally shoots Chuck. While Thomas mourns over Chuck, masked armed men then rush in and take the group to a helicopter. It flies over a vast desert wasteland and approaches a ruined city.

Later, the supposedly dead scientists meet in a room. Paige notes that the experiment has been successful and the survivors are now entering Phase Two.

Cast

 Dylan O'Brien as Thomas, the last male to enter the Glade
 Kaya Scodelario as Teresa, the only female to ever enter the Glade, as well as the last Glader
 Aml Ameen as Alby, the first to enter the Glade and the leader of the Gladers
 Thomas Brodie-Sangster as Newt, second-in-command of the Gladers
 Ki Hong Lee as Minho, the keeper of the runners
 Will Poulter as Gally, the keeper of the builders
 Patricia Clarkson as Ava Paige, the head of WCKD
 Blake Cooper as Chuck, a very young Glader
 Dexter Darden as Frypan, the cook
 Jacob Latimore as Jeff
 Chris Sheffield as Ben, a runner
 Joe Adler as Zart
 Randall D. Cunningham as Clint
 Alexander Flores as Winston
 Don McManus as Masked Man, an armed soldier who rescues the Gladers

Production

Development
On January 4, 2011, it was announced that 20th Century Fox had obtained the rights to a film adaptation of The Maze Runner by James Dashner, with Catherine Hardwicke attached to direct. On August 23, 2012 Wes Ball was confirmed to direct the film, with Gotham Group as producers. Ball produced a 3D computer-animated science fiction post-apocalyptic short film, titled Ruin, and presented the short in 3D to 20th Century Fox. The studio initially considered a film adaptation of the short film, as it had the same tone of The Maze Runner novel they already planned to bring to the screen. Ball was then offered the chance to direct the novel adaptation.

Griever design
Creature designer Ken Barthelmey designed the Grievers for the film. In late 2012, director Wes Ball hired him to work on the design. Barthelmey created a test design that he presented to director Wes Ball. Impressed by Barthelmey's work, Ball asked him to add a mechanical scorpion tail to the design. Barthelmey used various animal inspirations to come up with the design, including coconut crabs, caterpillars and piranhas. Besides the Grievers, Barthelmey also worked on several Maze, Beetle Blade (cut from the film) and Crank designs.

Casting
For the role of Teresa, Kaya Scodelario was Ball's first choice as she was "fantastic" and because he loved her in the TV show Skins. Dylan O'Brien, the lead role, was initially rejected by Ball. Ball recounts, "Dylan was actually... I saw him early on, very early on and I overlooked him. It was a big learning experience there because I overlooked him because of his hair. He had Teen Wolf hair and I couldn't see past that and so we were looking for our Thomas and it's a tough role to make because he comes in as a boy and he leaves as a man, so it can't be like this badass action star that comes into this movie. It's about vulnerability upfront and then he comes out of it and comes into his own and then the next movies are about the leader that emerges from the group. So finally Fox says 'We just did this movie, The Internship. There's this kid that's in this thing. He's like 20 years old. We think he's kind of got something.' So I watched his tape and was like 'Wait a minute, I've seen this kid before.' I looked him up online and there was one picture of him with a totally shaved head and it's this sweet vulnerable-looking kid and I was like 'Whoa, interesting.' I said, 'Wait a minute, he's just so familiar and I looked back at my old audition tapes, which we had thousands of, and there's Dylan. That guy I said 'No, definitely not him.' So we brought him back in and we started to talk with him and I'm like 'he's the coolest dude ever.'" Blake Cooper entered the film via Twitter. Ball revealed a lot on Twitter, and many kids wanted to be Chuck. Cooper constantly bugged Ball, until Ball told him to give his tape to his casting director, and Ball was impressed by Cooper's tape and cast him.

Filming
Principal photography started in Baton Rouge, Louisiana on May 13, 2013, and officially ended on July 12, 2013. Post-production on the film was completed in June 2014.

Soundtrack

Composed by John Paesano, the soundtrack consists of 21 tracks and was released on September 16, 2014.

Release
The film was originally set to be released on February 14, 2014. On October 5, 2013, the film was pushed back. IMAX theaters released the film on September 19, 2014.

Marketing

Eleven character cards for the film were released in July 2013. Starting in January 2014, director Wes Ball released one image from the film once a week, leading up to the film's first trailer released on March 17, 2014. A viral marketing campaign launched by 20th Century Fox began on April 16, 2014. The campaign is a website featuring the main characters while focusing on WCKD, an organization in Dashner's novel series of the same name. The website has the domain wckdisgood.com.

On June 26, 2014, O'Brien tweeted that the original The Maze Runner book would be re-released with a new book cover based on the film's poster. On July 29, 2014, the second trailer for the film was released exclusively on Yahoo! Movies.

Reception

Box office
The film grossed $102,427,862 in North America and more than $245.8million in other territories for a worldwide total of $348.3million.

Prior to its release in the U.S. and Canada, box office analysts predicted the film would be a box office success, citing effective marketing, good word-of-mouth publicity and a solid release date. Preliminary reports predicted the film would open with takings of over $30–32million in North America. According to movie-ticket sale website Fandango, The Maze Runner was the biggest seller accounting for more than 50% of early tickets sales. The film was released on September 19, 2014, in the United States and Canada across 3,604 locations and over 350 IMAX theaters. It earned $1.1million from Thursday night shows, and $11.25million on its opening day. It topped the box office on its opening weekend with $32.5million of which 9% of the gross came from IMAX theaters. Its opening weekend gross is the seventh highest for a film released in September, and the 18th highest for a young-adult book adaptation. The film earned a total of $102,272,088 at the North American box office becoming the 26th-highest-grossing film of 2014 in the U.S. and Canada.

Outside North America, the film debuted in five countries a week prior to its North American release and earned a total of $8.3million. The film had a similar success overseas during its wide-opening second weekend earning $38million from 7,547 screens in 51 markets. It opened in South Korea with $5.5millionhigher than the openings of The Hunger Games and Divergent, the UK, Ireland and Malta with $3.4million behind Gone Girl, and China with $14.58million behind Teenage Mutant Ninja Turtles. Other high openings were witnessed in Russia and the CIS ($5.75million), France ($5.2million), Australia ($3.4million), Mexico ($2.6million), Taiwan ($2.2million) and Brazil ($2million).

It became the third-highest-grossing film of all time in Malaysia for Fox (behind Avatar and X-Men: Days of Future Past).

Critical response

Review aggregator Rotten Tomatoes assigns the film a score of 65% based on 170 reviews, with an average rating of 5.9/10. The site's consensus states: "With strong acting, a solid premise, and a refreshingly dark approach to its dystopian setting, The Maze Runner stands out from the crowded field of YA sci-fi adventures". Metacritic gives the film a score of 57 out of 100, based on 34 critics, indicating "mixed or average reviews". Audiences surveyed by CinemaScore gave the film a grade of A− on an A+ to F scale. According to Tim Ryan of The Wall Street Journal, critics considered the film better than most young adult book-to-film adaptations due to its "strong performances and a creepy, mysterious atmosphere".

Rafer Guzman of Newsday gave the film a three out of four and described it as "solid, well crafted and entertaining". Christy Lemire of RogerEbert.com said she found the film intriguing, writing that "it tells us a story we think we've heard countless times before but with a refreshingly different tone and degree of detail". The Seattle Timess Soren Anderson said the film was "vastly superior to the book that inspired it" and gave it a score of 3/4. Tony Hicks of the San Jose Mercury News was "hooked by the combination of fine acting, intriguing premise and riveting scenery". Matthew Toomey of ABC Radio Brisbane gave the film a grade of A−, giving praise to its intriguing premise saying that "it held [his] attention for its full two hour running time". Justin Lowe of The Hollywood Reporter said it was "consistently engaging", and Ella Taylor of Variety wrote "as world-creation YA pictures go, The Maze Runner feels refreshingly low-tech and properly story-driven".

Michael O'Sullivan of The Washington Post said "The Maze Runner unravels a few mysteries, but it spins even more", giving it a 3/4. Stephen Whitty of the Newark Star-Ledger wrote "it does leave you wanting to see the next installment. And that's one special effect that very few YA movies ever pull off". Isaac Feldberg of We Got This Covered awarded the film 8/10 stars, calling it "dark, dangerous and uncommonly thrilling", while extolling it as "one of the most engaging YA adaptations to hit theaters in quite some time." Rick Bentley of The Fresno Bee praised Wes Ball's direction, saying that he "created balance between a thin but solid script and first-rate actionand he doesn't waste a frame doing it". Bill Zwecker of the Chicago Sun-Times called it "a well-acted and intelligent thriller/futuristic sci-fi romp". Bilge Ebiri of New York magazine said he "was quite riveted". Michael Sragow of the Orange County Register gave it a grade of B and said, "Ball is deft, though, at evoking claustrophobia of every kind, whether in the open-air prison of the Glade or the actual tight spaces of the Maze. And he elicits a hair-trigger performance from O'Brien".

Claudia Puig of USA Today said "a sci-fi thriller set in a vaguely post-apocalyptic future must create a fully drawn universe to thoroughly captivate the viewer. But Maze Runner feels only partially formed", giving it a score of 2/4. Time magazine's Richard Corliss said "like Jean-Paul Sartre's No Exit-tentialism, but more crowded and with the musk of bottled-up testosterone". Wesley Morris of the website Grantland said "I think I have a touch of apocalepsyexcessive sleepiness caused by prolonged exposure to three- and four-part series in which adolescents rebel against oppressive governments represented by esteemed actors". Steven Rea of The Philadelphia Inquirer gave the film a 2.5 out of 4 rating and said "it's bleak business, and as it hurries toward its explosive, expository conclusion, the film becomes nonsensical, too". Film critic Ethan Gilsdorf of The Boston Globe said "teens should eat up this fantasy's scenery-chewing angst and doom, and the hopeful tale of survival and empowerment (to be continued in the inevitable sequel or sequels)".

Accolades

Sequels

On October 11, 2013, it was reported that Twentieth Century Fox had acquired the rights to the second book, The Scorch Trials. A screenplay was written by T. S. Nowlin, with director Wes Ball supervising the scriptwriting. The sequel was released on September 18, 2015. On July 25, 2014, Ball announced at San Diego Comic-Con International that filming for the sequel would commence sometime between March and May 2015, should The Maze Runner become a success when it hits the theaters. However, two weeks prior to the film's release 20th Century Fox decided to move ahead with the sequel and pre-production began in early September 2014 in New Mexico. Cast members Dylan O'Brien, Kaya Scodelario, Thomas Brodie-Sangster, Ki-Hong Lee, and Patricia Clarkson reprised their roles for the sequel, as did director Wes Ball. It was announced that Aidan Gillen would be joining the film to play Janson ("Rat-Man"), as was Rosa Salazar who portrayed Brenda, Jacob Lofland who starred as Aris Jones, and Giancarlo Esposito who played Jorge Gallaraga.

A second sequel, Maze Runner: The Death Cure was released on January 26, 2018.

In pop culture

On February 27, 2020, South Korean boy band BTS released their music video "On", which referenced set pieces from The Maze Runner. The homage was noted by source book author Dashner on Twitter.

Anson Lo said the opening of his 2022 song "King Kong" music video paid tribute to The Maze Runner. He is the director of the music video.

References

External links

 
 
 
 

2014 films
2014 action thriller films
2010s science fiction adventure films
2014 science fiction action films
2010s teen films
American action thriller films
American science fiction action films
American science fiction thriller films
2010s English-language films
The Maze Runner
IMAX films
Films based on American novels
Films based on science fiction novels
Films set in North America
American post-apocalyptic films
American science fiction adventure films
Temple Hill Entertainment films
TSG Entertainment films
Films directed by Wes Ball
20th Century Fox films
2014 directorial debut films
Films produced by Wyck Godfrey
Films scored by John Paesano
Teen science fiction films
2010s American films